Lee Hyo-suk (born 28 March 1974) is a South Korean sports shooter. She competed in the women's 10 metre air pistol event at the 1996 Summer Olympics.

References

1974 births
Living people
South Korean female sport shooters
Olympic shooters of South Korea
Shooters at the 1996 Summer Olympics
Place of birth missing (living people)
20th-century South Korean women